Himla (Himladevi) Soodyall (b Durban, 1963) is a South African geneticist involved in finding some of the oldest human genetic lines, mainly focusing on Sub-Saharan Africa. Her work on DNA has pointed to southern Africa as the most likely geographic region of origin of the human species.

She is Director of the Human Genomic Diversity and Disease Research Laboratory, National Health Laboratory Service at the University of the Witwatersrand. She was awarded a Bronze Order of Mapungubwe in 2005 for her "Outstanding contributions in the field of science" in South Africa.

Education 
Soodyall was born in Durban and educated at Gandhi-Desai High School before obtaining a BSc  and BScHons at the University of Durban-Westville and an MSc in biotechnology from the University of the Witwatersrand. Her PhD, on human population and evolutionary genetics, was obtained in 1993 under the supervision of Trefor Jenkins.

Career 
Soodyall spent 4 years on a Fogarty International Fellowship (from the National Institutes of Health in the United States) at Pennsylvania State University doing postdoctoral research with Mark Stoneking. In 1996 she returned to South Africa to set up her own laboratory at the South African Institute for Medical Research (now the National Health Laboratory Service). Here she conducted population and evolutionary genetics research.

In 2001 she was appointed director of the Human Genomic Diversity and Disease Research Unit at WITS. She was also invited to participate in the Genographic Project as the principal investigator for sub-Saharan Africa.

Recognition, awards, memberships 
1999 President's Award from the NRF
1999 WITS Vice-Chancellor's Award for research
2005 Order of Mapungubwe (Bronze) for her "Outstanding contributions in the field of science"

Selected publications 
Soodyall is the author of "A Walk in the Garden of Eden". She is also the author or co-author of more than 90 academic publications, including:

References

External links 

South African geneticists
Human geneticists
Living people
South African women scientists
21st-century women scientists
1963 births
Academic staff of the University of the Witwatersrand